Festival Lanterns is an outdoor 2006 art installation consisting of granite and steel sculptures by American artist Brian Goldbloom, installed in northwest Portland, Oregon, in the United States. The work is administered by the Regional Arts & Culture Council.

Description
Festival Lanterns (2006) features a series of outdoor granite and steel sculptures, each measuring  x  x , installed between Northwest 3rd Avenue and 4th Avenue at Davis Street and Flanders Street in Portland's Old Town Chinatown neighborhood. Each of the lantern structures are identical in form and placement, "in response to the festival streets' formal layouts", but house unique carvings that "symbolize one or more of the following subjects: a people of common cultural identity, a place in time, historic uses of nearby structures". The southern sculpture at 3rd and Davis remembers artifacts from Japantown which stood on that site until the internment of Japanese Americans in 1942, while the north sculpture at 3rd and Flanders commemorates the construction of Portland's historic and current rail systems. According to the Regional Arts & Culture Council, which administers the work, each of the lanterns "can be seen conceptually as a source of 'light' which radiates energy into the community".

See also

 2006 in art
 Friendship Circle, a nearby sculpture by Lee Kelly and Michael Stirling, celebrating the sister city relationship between Portland and Sapporo, Japan

References

2006 establishments in Oregon
2006 sculptures
Granite sculptures in Oregon
Japanese-American culture in Portland, Oregon
Northwest Portland, Oregon
Old Town Chinatown
Outdoor sculptures in Portland, Oregon
Steel sculptures in Oregon